Irvoll is a Norwegian surname. Notable people with the surname include:

Fam Irvoll (born 1980), Norwegian fashion designer 
Grethe Irvoll (born 1939), Norwegian feminist and politician

Norwegian-language surnames